Charles Otieno Oduro is a Kenyan midfielder currently in the ranks of Kenyan Premier League side Nairobi City Stars.

Career
Oduro joined the side in 2017 after relegation from the top flight and was part of the side that gained promotion to the top flight after the 2019/20 second-tier season. He renewed his contract for a further two years after the promotion till the end of the 2021/22 season. 

He was handed his premier league debut in January 2021 by head coach Sanjin Alagic as City Stars visited Sofapaka F.C. in Wundanyi for a matchday 9 tie.

Honours

Club
Nairobi City Stars
National Super League
 Champions (1): 2019-20

References

2000 births
Living people
Kenyan footballers
Nairobi City Stars players
Kenyan Premier League players